The Embassy of Uruguay in Washington, D.C., is the diplomatic mission of  Uruguay to the United States. 

The embassy also operates Consulates-General in Miami, New York City and San Francisco.

Location
The embassy is located at 1913 I (Eye) Street NW in the Downtown Washington, D.C., area, near the International Monetary Fund, and George Washington University.

Ambassador

The current ambassador of Uruguay to the United States is Andrés Durán Hareau.

See also
 Uruguay-United States relations
 Foreign relations of Uruguay
 List of Washington, D.C., embassies

References

External links

 Embassy website

Uruguay
Washington, D.C.
United States–Uruguay relations